Lamberto Zauli (born 19 July 1971) is an Italian professional football coach and former player who is the head coach of  club Crotone. As a player, he spent his career as an attacking midfielder, but was also capable of playing on the left wing on occasion.

Club career
Born in Rome, Lamberto grew up in Grosseto, playing in the youth squad of U.S. Grosseto, the same club of his father Lorenzo. His professional career began in the youth squad of Modena, during the 1989–90 season down in Serie C1. He moved into the Serie C2 division with Centese he notched up over 20 games with the club during the only season he was with them.

Marche club Fano then signed Zauli, but, despite his potential, he only played one season for them: returning to Modena, who were now in Serie B. He soon moved to Ravenna Calcio, being also loaned to Crevalcore after one season. In 1994, he made his return to Ravenna, in Serie C1, where they gained promotion into Serie B this brought Zauli's talents to the attention of Serie A sides.

From 1997 until 2001, Zauli played with Vicenza Calcio; in his first season with the club, he even scored three goals in the 1997–98 edition of the UEFA Cup Winners' Cup competition, where Vicenza reached the semi-finals, losing out to eventual champions Chelsea F.C.; the club's performances during this time earned the team the nickname "Real Vicenza", a reference to Real Madrid. After the club's relegation, he helped Vicenza regain Serie A promotion in 2000, winning the Serie B title. After experiencing a second relegation in 2001, however, Zauli was transferred to Bologna for a season. He then moved on to Palermo from 2002 till 2005, in what proved to be one of the most successful times in the club's history, with the rosanero winning the Serie B in 2004 title to rise from Serie B to Serie A, and subsequently qualifying for the European stage.

After his Sicilian experience, Zauli was transferred to Sampdoria for the start of the 2005–06 season. After problems fitting in at the Genoa based club, Zauli returned to Bologna in January 2006. He then joined Cremonese for the 2007–08 season with little success, and ended his playing career with Lega Pro Seconda Divisione club Bellaria in 2008–09.

Managerial career
In June 2009 it was revealed Bellaria had appointed Zauli as head coach, thus giving him the opportunity to stay in what proved to have been his final team as a player.

He was sacked in April 2010 following a string of unimpressive results that left Bellaria deep into the relegation playoff zone.

On 29 June 2010 he was announced as new head coach of Fano in Lega Pro Seconda Divisione.

On 3 January 2012 he was announced as new head coach of Reggiana, in Lega Pro Prima Divisione.

Zauli was successively appointed at the helm of newly promoted Lega Pro club Pordenone for the 2014–15 season, but was dismissed on 23 September 2014 due to poor results.

Following an experience as manager of the Juventus Primavera, on 22 August 2020, Zauli was appointed head coach of Serie C club Juventus U23, the reserve team of Juventus. On 16 July 2021, Zauli extended his contract for Juventus U23. On 13 June 2022, he left Juventus U23 to join Serie B side Südtirol. He however left the club by mutual consent on 9 August 2022, a week before the start of the season, due to the poor results achieved.

On 13 January 2023, Zauli signed a contract with Serie C club Crotone until the end of the season with an option to extend.

Style of play
A tall, modern, and physically strong attacking midfielder or winger, Zauli was a creative player, who, in addition to his physical attributes, was gifted with elegance and grace on the ball, as well as excellent technique and dribbling skills. He was known in particular for his goalscoring from midfield, due to his striking ability from outside the area, and his ability on free-kicks. His talent, control, stature, and performances, in particular in the Italian second division, earned him the nickname: "the Zidane of Serie B".

Honours

Club
Vicenza
Serie B: 1999–2000

Palermo
Serie B: 2003–04

References

External links
 Player history at Cremonese's website
 

1971 births
Living people
Italian footballers
Footballers from Rome
People from Grosseto
Sportspeople from the Province of Grosseto
Association football midfielders
Modena F.C. players
Ravenna F.C. players
L.R. Vicenza players
Bologna F.C. 1909 players
Palermo F.C. players
U.C. Sampdoria players
U.S. Cremonese players
Alma Juventus Fano 1906 players
A.C. Bellaria Igea Marina players
Serie A players
Serie B players
Serie C players
Italian football managers
A.C. Bellaria Igea Marina managers
Juventus Next Gen managers
F.C. Südtirol managers
F.C. Crotone managers
Serie C managers
Footballers from Tuscany